Georganna Sinkfield (born February 11, 1943) is an American politician who served in the Georgia House of Representatives from 1983 to 2011.

References

External links 
 Georganna Sinkfield at ballotpedia.org

1943 births
Living people
Democratic Party members of the Georgia House of Representatives